IM or Im may refer to:

Arts and entertainment
 I.M (rapper), stage name of Im Chang-kyun of South Korean boy band Monsta X
 "I.M" (song), a song by Israeli singer Michael Ben David
 Iron Maiden, a British heavy metal band
 Iron Man, a comic book superhero

Businesses
 IM Global, an American film and TV company
 Immediate Music, a music composition company
 Menajet (IATA: IM), a Lebanese airline

Military and government
 Indian Mujahideen, an India-based militant Islamist group
 Inoffizieller Mitarbeiter, an informant for the Stasi of East Germany

Mythology
 Im (jötunn), a giant in Norse mythology
 IM, a cuneiform sign used as a logogram to represent names of weather gods, including Mesopotamian Ishkur/Adad, Hurrian Teshub and Hittite Tarhunna

Names
 Im (Korean surname)
 Yan (surname) (Cantonese romanization: Im), a surname

Places
 IM postcode area, for the Isle of Man
 Isle of Man (FIPS country code)

Science and technology

Biology and medicine
 Infectious mononucleosis, a disease
 Internal medicine, a medical speciality
 IM injection, or intramuscular injection
 Imipramine, by the trade name IM
 Intermediate metabolizer, an individual with reduced metabolic activity

Computing
 .im, an Internet country code for the Isle of Man
 Information management
 Input method, a component that allows users to enter an expanded set of characters and symbols
 Instant messaging, a form of real-time communication online using typed text

Other uses in science and technology
 Im function in mathematics, where Im(z) denotes the imaginary part of a complex number z
 Intermodulation, the amplitude modulation of signals containing two or more different frequencies
 Induction motor
 Im, a subtype of irregular galaxy

Sports
 Individual medley, a type of swimming race
 International Master, a title in chess
 Intramural sports

Other
 Independent Methodist (disambiguation) 
 Scion iM, a Japanese-American compact car

See also
 I Am (disambiguation) including uses of "I'm"
 LM (disambiguation)
 1M (disambiguation)